The Great Vacation Vol.2: Super Best of Glay is a compilation album by Japanese band Glay, released on October 21, 2009. It reached #1 at Billboard Japan Top Albums chart and #1 on Oricon charts, selling sold 187,732 copies. It was certified gold  for shipment of over 100,000 copies.

Track list

Disc 1
 Rain
Manatsu no Tobira
Kanojo no "Modern..."
Freeze My Love
Zutto Futari de...
Gone with the Wind
Yes, Summerdays
Ikiteku Tsuyosa
Glorious
Beloved
A Boy: Zutto Wasurenai
Curtain Call
Haru wo Aisuru Hito
Kuchibiru
However

Disc 2
Yuuwaku
Soul Love
Pure Soul
I'm in Love
Be with You
Winter, Again
 Survival
Kokodewanai, Dokoka e
Happiness: Winter Mix
Tomadoi
Special Thanks
Goran, Sekai wa Kurusimi ni Michite Iruyo
Two Bell Silence
 Shutter Speed No Theme
 Acid Head
Burst

Disc 3
Great Vacation
Fame Is Dead
 Absolute "Zero"
 RainbirD
Let Me Be
Black Eyes She Had
Tokyo Vice Terror
 1988
 Ruca
 Omae to Tomo ni Aru
 Real Shadow

References

Glay albums
2009 compilation albums
EMI Music Japan compilation albums